The 2014 SIU Edwardsville Cougars softball team represented Southern Illinois University Edwardsville during the 2014 NCAA Division I softball season. The Cougars, led by twenty-sixth year head coach Sandy Montgomery, played their home games at Cougar Field as a member of the Ohio Valley Conference (OVC).

Preseason

With twelve returning players from the 35–13 2013 squad, the Cougars were picked by the coaches and sports information directors of the Ohio Valley Conference to finish first in the West Division.

Regular season
The season began with tournaments in Louisiana, Arizona, Mississippi, and Florida. Among the sixteen opponents in those tournaments were eight teams that would end their seasons in the NCAA Tournament, including defending national champion Oklahoma. Coach Sandy Montgomery's intent was to challenge her team early in preparation for the conference schedule. The Cougars started slowly, but showed improvement in each successive tournament; losing all four games at LSU, then winning one of five at Arizona State, two of five at Jackson State, and three of five at Central Florida.

After the tournaments, the Cougars had the full Ohio Valley Conference schedule, games versus three Missouri Valley Conference (MVC) schools, and home-and-home games with St. Louis; a scheduled game against SIU-Carbondale was cancelled due to thunderstorms. The Cougars lost to Missouri State and Northern Iowa, who both ended the season with winning records, but they defeated eventual MVC champion and NCAA tourney entry Bradley. SIUE and SLU split, each winning in the other's ballpark. In non-conference play, the Cougars earned an 8–16 record.

In the OVC, the Cougars were 10–2 against the East Division. They went 9–3 versus the West after hitting an unexpected bump in the road when losing both games at Murray State. The combined 19–5 conference record was good for first place in the West Division and the #2 seed in the OVC Tournament.

Highlights

Sophomore Haley Chambers pitched no-hit games against Tennessee Tech and Southeast Missouri State, the second and third of her SIUE career.

Coach Sandy Montgomery won her 900th game as the Cougars' head coach in the win over St. Louis.

Four Cougars were named to the All–Ohio Valley Conference teams:
Haley Chambers, Chelsea Yankolovich, Allison Smiley, and Whitney Lanphier were named to the All–OVC second team.
Allison Smiley and Whitney Lanphier were also named to the OVC All–Newcomer team.

Haley Chambers was named second team All-Mideast Region by the National Fastpitch Coaches Association.

Postseason

The Cougars entered the double-elimination Ohio Valley Conference at Jacksonville State's University Field as the #2 seed.

After defeating Tennessee Tech and Eastern Illinois, the Cougars awaited an opponent for the finals. Continued thunderstorms eventually forced the conference to shorten the semifinals and finals to a single-elimination format. Murray State emerged from the loser's bracket, and the SIUE women dispatched them 12–1 in five innings, earning the OVC's entry in the NCAA national tournament.

Haley Chambers not only pitched all three games, striking out 27 in 20 innings, she also drove in the winning run in the Cougars' first game with a home run. She was named the tournament's MVP. Chambers, third baseman Alex McDavid, first baseman Kayla Riggs, and shortstop Chelsea Yankolovich also all selected to the All-Tournament team.

The Cougars were the first SIUE team to qualify for NCAA post-season play since the university made the transition to Division I.

Of the sixteen regional tournaments, only Tuscaloosa, Alabama had three of the top 25 ranked teams, and that was the Cougars' tournament destination, as the only unranked team.

SIUE was game versus host Alabama, 5th ranked and the #2 national seed, but fell to the eventual national runner-up Crimson Tide 13–4 in five innings.  In the losers' bracket, the Cougars faced 22nd ranked South Alabama in a game that was close until the Jaguars claimed the victory with a three-run seventh-inning home run.

Roster
Pink background indicates players returning from 2012–13.

Schedule 

|-
!colspan=9| LSU Tiger Classic

|-
!colspan=9| Arizona State Littlewood Classic

|-
!colspan=9| Jackson State Tournament

|-
!colspan=9| UCF Tournament

|-
!colspan=9|

|-
!colspan=9|Ohio Valley Conference Tournament

|-
!colspan=9|NCAA Tuscaloosa Regional Tournament

References

SIU Edwardsville
SIU Edwardsville Cougars softball seasons